The British Leeward Islands was a British colony from 1671 to 1958, consisting of the English (later British) overseas possessions in the Leeward Islands. It ceased to exist from 1816 to 1833, during which time it was split into two separate colonies (Antigua–Barbuda–Montserrat and Saint Christopher–Nevis–Anguilla–Virgin Islands). It was dissolved in 1958 after the separation of the British Virgin Islands, and the remaining islands became parts of the West Indies Federation.

History
The Leeward Islands was established as an English colony in 1671. In 1816, the islands were divided in two regions: Antigua, Barbuda, and Montserrat in one colony, and Saint Christopher, Nevis, Anguilla, and the Virgin Islands in the other.

The Leeward Islands were united again as a semi-federal entity in 1833, coming together until 1872 under the administration of the Governor of Antigua. The islands then became known as the Federal Colony of the Leeward Islands from 1872 to 1956. From 1833 to 1940, Dominica was part of the colony; in 1940, it was transferred to the British Windward Islands group. 

On 3 January 1958 all islands except the Virgin Islands were absorbed into the West Indies Federation. The British Leeward Islands finally ceased to exist with the abolition of the office of its governor, and the elevation of the British Virgin Islands to the status of a separate crown colony, in 1960.

A representative Leeward Islands cricket team continues to participate in West Indian domestic cricket.

Armed forces structure in 1939
The armed forces of the colony included structures from Saint Kitts and Nevis, Montserrat, Antigua, Dominica, and British Virgin Islands.

 Saint Kitts and Nevis Defence Force
 Royal Montserrat Defence Force
 Royal Antigua Defense Force
 Dominica Defense Force

Postage stamps 

The islands of the Leeward Islands all used postage stamps inscribed "LEEWARD ISLANDS" between 1890 and 1 July 1956, often concurrently with stamps inscribed with the colony's name. The islands also issued revenue stamps between 1882 and the 1930s.

See also 
List of governors of the Leeward Islands
Attorney General of the Leeward Islands
Chief Justice of the Leeward Islands
British Windward Islands
History of the British West Indies

References

Sources and further reading

 Dator, James. "Frank Travels: Space, Power and Slave Mobility in the British Leeward Islands, c. 1700–1730." Slavery & Abolition 36.2 (2015): 335-359. online

 Fergus, Howard A. A history of education in the British Leeward Islands, 1838-1945 (University of West Indies Press, 2003).
 Hicks, Dan. "Material improvements: The archaeology of estate landscapes in the British Leeward Islands, 1713–1838." in State Landscapes: Design, Improvement, and Power in the Post-Medieval Landscape (Boydell and Brewer, 2007) pp: 205-227. online

 Higman, Barry W. "Small Islands, Large Questions: Post-Emancipation Historiography of the Leeward Islands." in Small Islands, Large Questions (Routledge, 2014) pp. 8-28.

External links
Leeward Islands – Flag

 
.Leeward Islands
Leeward Islands (Caribbean)
Leeward Islands
Former countries in the Caribbean
Leeward Islands
Former federations
History of British Antigua and Barbuda
History of British Dominica
History of British Saint Christopher and Nevis
Saint Christopher-Nevis-Anguilla
States and territories established in 1833
States and territories disestablished in 1978
1830s establishments in the Caribbean
1833 establishments in the British Empire
1978 disestablishments in the British Empire
1833 establishments in North America
1978 disestablishments in North America
British Windward Islands
Barbados